Enslow Publishing is an American publisher of books and eBooks founded by Ridley M. Enslow, Jr. in 1976. Enslow publishes educational nonfiction, fiction, historical fiction, and trade books for children and young adults. Their books are intended to be sold to school and public libraries.

Its current imprints include Enslow Elementary, Speeding Star and Chasing Roses. MyReportLinks.com Books and Bailey Books are currently out-of-print imprints. MyReportLinks.com Books is the properly formatted name.

Enslow uses third-party authors to write the manuscripts, and uses in-house editorial and production staff to create their final products. Marketing, warehousing, and shipping operations are conducted at their headquarters in Berkeley Heights location.

Enslow was acquired by Roger Rosen of Rosen Publishing in 2014.

Notable books
Enslow Publishers has published titles that have won many awards. Most recently is the title Jesse Owens: "I Always Loved Running" written by Jeff Burlingame won a NAACP Image Award for Outstanding Literary Work, Youth/Teens.

 Jesse Owens: "I Always Loved Running", Jeff Burlingame (2011) NAACP Image Award Winner
 Malcolm X: "I Believe in the Brotherhood of Man, All Men ", Jeff Burlingame (2011) NAACP Image Award Nomination

Imprints
Imprints include Enslow Elementary, Speeding Star (established in 2013 and unveiled at BookExpo America in June 2013), Chasing Roses, Scarlet Voyage, and MyReportLinks.com Books.

See also

List of English language book publishers
List of publishers of children's books
List of group-0 ISBN publisher codes
List of group-1 ISBN publisher codes
List of English-language small presses

References

External links
 Enslow Official Website

Book publishing companies based in New Jersey
Publishing companies established in 1976
1976 establishments in New Jersey
Privately held companies based in New Jersey
Companies based in Union County, New Jersey